The 2020–21 EuroCup Basketball season was the 19th season of Euroleague Basketball's secondary level professional club basketball tournament. It was the 13th season since it was renamed from the ULEB Cup to the EuroCup, and the fifth season under the title sponsorship name of 7DAYS.

Team allocation 
A total of 24 teams from 10 leagues participate in the 2020–21 EuroCup Basketball. In response to the premature ending of the previous season caused by the COVID-19 pandemic, the eight teams that qualified for the quarterfinals were awarded with guaranteed spots. The remaining spots were awarded to teams qualifying through their domestic league's final standings. On 15 June 2020, the preliminary team list for the season was approved. On 22 June 2020, the team list was approved by the ECA shareholders executive board, selecting Dolomiti Energia Trento to replace Fraport Skyliners who have withdrawn from the competition. On 17 September 2020, Mornar Bar replaced Maccabi Rishon LeZion which was forced to withdraw due to logistical difficulties and financial concerns complicated by the COVID-19 pandemic.

Teams 
The labels in the parentheses show how each team qualified for the place of its starting round:
EC: EuroCup quarterfinalists
1st, 2nd, 3rd, 4th, etc.: League positions
Abd-: League positions of abandoned season due to the COVID-19 pandemic as determined by the leagues

<div style="width:100%;">

Notes

Referees 
A total of 70 Euroleague Basketball referees set to work on the 2020–21 season:

Round and draw dates 
The schedule of the competition is as follows. On November 16, 2021, EuroCup Board adapt the competition calendar to the disruption caused by the COVID-19 pandemic. The Board agreed to delay the start of the Top 16 phase of the competition, which was set to start on December 30, 2020, with the new start date being set for January 13, 2021. The calendar modification provided an extended window for any remaining rescheduled games to be played ahead of the following phase, reducing risk of games being cancelled. Additionally, the deadlines to play any remaining rescheduled games ahead of the regular season and Top 16 were set on January 5, 2021 and March 16, 2021 respectively.

The original schedule of the competition, as planned before the adjustments caused by the pandemic, was as follows.

Draw 
The draw was held on 10 July 2020 in Barcelona, Spain. Media and clubs representatives were allowed to attend the draw due to COVID-19 pandemic restrictions.

The 24 teams were drawn into four groups of six, with the restriction that teams from the same league could not be drawn against each other. For the draw, the teams were seeded into six pots, in accordance with the Club Ranking, based on their performance in European competitions during a three-year period and the lowest possible position that any club from that league can occupy in the draw is calculated by adding the results of the worst performing team from each league.

Notes

 Indicates teams with points applying the minimum for the league they play.

The fixtures were decided after the draw, using a computer draw not shown to public, with the following match sequence:

Note: Positions for scheduling do not use the seeding pots, e.g., Team 1 is not necessarily the team from Pot 1 in the draw.

There were scheduling restrictions: for example, teams from the same city in general were not scheduled to play at home on the same round (to avoid them playing at home on the same day or on consecutive days, due to logistics and crowd control).

Regular season

In each group, teams played against each other home-and-away in a round-robin format. The group winners, runners-up, third-placed teams and fourth-placed teams advanced to the Top 16, while the fifth-placed teams and sixth-placed teams were eliminated.

Group A

Group B

Group C

Group D

Top 16
In each group, teams played against each other home-and-away in a round-robin format. The group winners and runners-up advanced to the playoffs, while the third-placed teams and fourth-placed teams were eliminated.

Group E

Group F

Group G

Group H

Playoffs
In the playoffs, teams play against each other must win two games to win the series. Thus, if one team wins two games before all three games have been played, the game that remains is omitted. The team that finished in the higher Top 16 place will play the first and the third (if it is necessary) legs of the series at home. The playoffs involves the eight teams which qualified as winners and runners-up of each of the four groups in the Top 16.

Bracket

Quarterfinals
The first legs were played on 23 March, the second legs on 26 March and the third legs on 31 March 2021, if necessary.

|}

Semifinals
The first legs were played on 6 April, the second legs on 9 April and the third legs on 14 April 2021, if necessary.

|}

Finals
The first leg was played on 27 April, the second leg on 30 April.

|}

Awards
All official awards of the 2020–21 EuroCup Basketball.

EuroCup MVP

Finals MVP

All–7DAYS EuroCup Teams

Coach of the Year

Rising Star

Regular Season MVP

Top 16 MVP

Quarterfinals MVP

Semifinals MVP

MVP of the Week

See also 
2020–21 EuroLeague
2020–21 Basketball Champions League
2020–21 FIBA Europe Cup

Notes

References

External links 
Official website

 
EuroCup Basketball seasons